Xise (Mandarin: 各卡乡) is a township in Garzê County, Garzê Tibetan Autonomous Prefecture, Sichuan, China. In 2010, Xise Township had a total population of 2,499: 1,178 males and 1,321 females: 538 aged under 14, 1,803 aged between 15 and 65 and 158 aged over 65.

References 
 

Township-level divisions of Sichuan
Populated places in the Garzê Tibetan Autonomous Prefecture